Delphinium occidentale, the western larkspur, is a perennial plant in the buttercup family (Ranunculaceae) with purple flowers. It grows along streambanks and moist areas of the Great Basin in Nevada and Utah.

There are racemes of many small flowers at the ends of branches, ranging from dark blue to white. The leaves are large and palmate.

The most widespread tall larkspur, it is also very poisonous.

References

occidentale
Plants described in 1885